A federal capital is a political entity, often a municipality or capital city, that serves as the seat of the federal government. A federal capital is typically a city that physically encompasses the offices and meeting places of its respective government, where its location and relationship to subnational states are fixed by law or federal constitution. Federal capitals may or may not be considered states in themselves, and either exercise significant political autonomy from the federation or are directly ruled by the national government located within their premises, as federal districts.

Federal capitals are often new creations.  That is, they are not established in one of the existing state capitals (but they may well be a pre-existing city).  They have not grown organically as capitals tend to do in unitary states.  This is because the creation of a federation is a new political entity and it is usually necessary not to favour any one of the constituent state capitals by making it the federation capital.  This is also the motivation behind the creation of federal capital territories as districts governed apart from the constituent state governments.  It is especially important that the choice of federal capital be neutral in multi-ethnic states such as Nigeria.

Examples of well-known federal capitals include Washington, D.C., which is not part of any U.S. state but borders Maryland and Virginia; Berlin, which is a state of Germany in its own right and forms an enclave within the much larger state of Brandenburg; and the Australian Capital Territory, a territory of Australia which includes the capital city of Australia, Canberra.

Canada is the only federation in the world not to accord a special administrative subdivision to its capital. Rather, Ottawa is merely another municipality in the Province of Ontario. The Canadian government does designate the Ottawa area as the National Capital Region, although this term merely represents the jurisdictional area of the government agency that administers federally owned lands and buildings, and is not an actual political unit. The City of Ottawa is governed as any other city in Ontario would be.

List of federal capitals

Current

Argentina: Autonomous City of Buenos Aires, formerly Capital Federal
Austria: Vienna
Australia: Australian Capital Territory of Canberra
Belgium: Brussels-Capital Region
Bosnia and Herzegovina: Sarajevo
Brazil: Federal District of Brasília
Canada: Ottawa
Comoros: Moroni
Ethiopia: Addis Ababa
Germany: Berlin
India: New Delhi
Iraq: Baghdad
Malaysia: Kuala Lumpur and Putrajaya 
Mexico: Mexico City
Micronesia, Federated States of: Palikir
Nepal: Kathmandu
Nigeria: Federal Capital Territory of Abuja
Pakistan: Islamabad
Russia: Moscow
Saint Kitts and Nevis: Basseterre
Somalia: Mogadishu
South Sudan: Juba (proposed future federal capital: Ramciel)
Spain: Madrid
Sudan: Khartoum
Switzerland: Bern
United Arab Emirates: Abu Dhabi
United States: Washington, D.C.
Venezuela: Caracas

Former and historical

Brazil: Rio de Janeiro
Federal Republic of Central America: Guatemala City, then San Salvador
Confederate States: Richmond, Virginia
Czechoslovakia (1969–1992): Prague
United Kingdom of Libya: Tripoli and Benghazi
Mali Federation: Dakar
Nigeria: Lagos
Rhodesia and Nyasaland: Salisbury
Soviet Union: Moscow
West Germany: Bonn
West Indies Federation: Chaguaramas
Yugoslavia: Belgrade

References

Further reading 
 Donald C. Rowat, "Ways of governing federal capitals", in John H. Taylor, Jean G. Lengellé, Caroline Andrew (eds), Capital Cities/Les Capitales: International Perspectives/Perspectives Internationales, McGill-Queen's Press, 1993 .
 Donald C. Rowat, The Government of Federal Capitals, University of Toronto Press, 1973 .
 Enid Slack, Rupak Chattopadhyay (eds), Finance and Governance of Capital Cities in Federal Systems, McGill-Queen's Press, 2009 .

Types of administrative division